Antônio Damaso de Carvalho (12 August 1913 – 2007) was a Brazilian sprinter. He competed in the men's 400 metres at the 1936 Summer Olympics.

References

External links
 

1913 births
2007 deaths
Athletes (track and field) at the 1936 Summer Olympics
Brazilian male sprinters
Olympic athletes of Brazil
Athletes from Rio de Janeiro (city)
20th-century Brazilian people